IPS, ips, or iPS may refer to:

Science and technology

Biology and medicine
 Ips (genus), a genus of bark beetle
 Induced pluripotent stem cell or iPS cells
 Intermittent photic stimulation, a neuroimaging technique
 Intraparietal sulcus, a region of the brain

Computing
 IPS (in-plane switching), screen technology for liquid-crystal displays
Image Packaging System, OpenSolaris software
 Instructions per second, a measure of a computer's processor speed
 Internet Provider Security
 Interpreter for Process Structures, used in AMSAT satellites
 International Patching System file extension, see ROM hacking
 Indoor positioning system, for wireless location indoors
 Intrusion prevention system, network security appliance

Mathematics
 Inner product space, a vector space with an additional structure called an inner product

Other uses in science and technology
 Inboard propulsion system, for watercraft by Volvo Penta
 Inch per second, a unit of speed
 Inch–pound–second system of units, a system of measurement sometimes used in engineering (i.e. CAD design)
 Inclined plate settler, a type of clarifier used in water purification; See Lamella clarifier
 Interplanetary Superhighway, a collection of gravitationally determined pathways through the Solar System
 Introductory Physical Science
 IPS/UPS, an electric power transmission grid of some CIS countries
 Iron pipe size

Organizations

International
 Industrial and provident society, in the UK, Ireland, and New Zealand
 Industrial Promotion Services of the Aga Khan Fund for Economic Development
 Institute of Professional Sound
 Inter Press Service, a global news agency
 International Parliamentary Scholarship
 International Planetarium Society
 International Polarisation Scale
 International Primatological Society
 International Professional Surfers
 International Pyrotechnics Society

United States
 Ford Dorsey Program in International Policy Studies
 Indianapolis Public Schools
 Institute for Policy Studies
 Institute for the Psychological Sciences
 Invision Power Services
 I Promise School, elementary school in Akron, Ohio

Other organizations
 Identity and Passport Service, United Kingdom
 Indian Police Service
 Insectivorous Plant Society, Japan
 Institute for Palestine Studies, Lebanon
 Institute for Politics and Society, Czech Republic
 Iraqi Police Service
 Irish Prison Service
 Israel Prison Service

Other uses
 IPS Supported Employment, for people who have a severe mental illness
 Investment policy statement, stipulating how an investor's money is to be managed
 International Parcel Service, a fictional delivery company featured on the sitcom The King of Queens

See also
 IPSS (disambiguation)